David Garza may refer to:

 David Lee Garza (born 1957), American Tejano musician
 David Garza (musician) (born 1971), American musician and artist
 David Garza (racing driver) (born 1988), Mexican race car driver
 David Garza (Paralympic footballer) (born 1993), American Paralympic soccer player